Zanecin may refer to:
Żanecin, Sokołów County, Poland
Żanęcin, Otwock County, Poland